Hymenopappus hintoniorum is a North American species of flowering plant in the daisy family. It grows in northern Mexico, in the state of Coahuila.

Hymenopappus hintoniorum grows at high elevations (3000 meters (10,000 feet) or more above sea level) in the Sierra Madre Occidental. It is a biennial herb up to 150 cm (5 feet) tall. It has very narrow divided leaves, resembling branching threads. One plant produces numerous flower heads in flat-topped clusters, each head with 100 or more yellow disc flowers but no ray flowers.

References

External links
Photo of herbarium specimen collected in Coahuila in 1985

hintoniorum
Endemic flora of Mexico
Flora of Coahuila
Plants described in 1985